Mt. Gandhamadana is the tallest peak on Pamban Island which lies in the Palk Strait between mainland India and Sri Lanka. It is believed by many people that Lord Hanuman resides there.

Location 

Gandhamadana is located 3 kilometres from Rameswaram, almost midway between the western edge of the island and the ghost-town of Dhanushkodi at the corner of the eastern promontory.

History 

Mt. Gandhamadana is believed to be the hillock from whose summit, the Rama-devotee Hanuman, commenced his flight to Ravana's Lanka. Kalidasa [Kumarasambhava, VI] refers to Gandhamadana, in the vicinity of the mythical city of Osadhiprastha in Himalaya Mountain, having Santanaka trees.

Nath tradition holds that Parashurama, after enacting his vengeance, sought out Dattatreya atop Mount Gandhamadana for spiritual guidance. Their conversations gave rise to Tripura Rahasya, a treatise on Advaita Vedanta. It was here the deity instructed the warrior-sage on knowledge of scripture, renunciation of worldly activities, and non-duality, thus freeing Parashurama from the cycle of death and rebirth. Gandhamadan Parvat is also known as Rama Feet.

References

External links
 Maps of India

Mountains of Tamil Nadu
Places in the Ramayana
Mountains in Buddhism